Crenicichla niederleinii is a species of cichlid native to South America. It is found in the Paraná River basin, in tributaries of the upper Paraná River in Argentina, Brazil and Paraguay.

The fish is named in honor of German botanist Gustav Niederlein (1858-1924), who was invited by the Argentinean ministry of agriculture to organize a herbarium, whereby he obtained the type specimen.

References

Kullander, S.O., 2003. Cichlidae (Cichlids). p. 605-654. In R.E. Reis, S.O. Kullander and C.J. Ferraris, Jr. (eds.) Checklist of the Freshwater Fishes of South and Central America. Porto Alegre: EDIPUCRS, Brasil.

niederleinii
Fish of Argentina
Freshwater fish of Brazil
Fish of Paraguay
Taxa named by Eduardo Ladislao Holmberg
Fish described in 1891